Tirumeni Azhagar Temple is a Siva temple in Manikkiramam in Mayiladuthurai district in Tamil Nadu (India).

Vaippu Sthalam
It is one of the shrines of the Vaippu Sthalams sung by Tamil Saivite Nayanar Appar.

Presiding deity
The presiding deity is Tirumeni Azhagar. The Goddess is known as Soundaranayaki.

Other shrines
This place is also known as Madhangasiramam.  Shrines of Vinayaka, Subramania with his consorts Valli and Deivanai, Gajalakshmi, 
Bairava and Durga are found in this temple.

References

Hindu temples in Mayiladuthurai district
Shiva temples in Mayiladuthurai district